Justin Snow (born December 21, 1976) is a former American football long snapper who played in the National Football League (NFL). He played college football at Baylor University. He signed as an undrafted free agent in 2000 with the Indianapolis Colts, who he played twelve seasons with. Winning Super Bowl XLI with the Colts against the Chicago Bears is his biggest accomplishment.

He was also a member of the Washington Redskins.

High school career
Snow was born in Abilene, Texas and attended Cooper High School where he was an AP and a Texas Sportswriters Association All-State First-team selection, and, as a senior, recorded ten sacks, 70 tackles, three forced fumbles, and two fumble recoveries.

College career
Snow attended Baylor University and was a four-year letterman in football as both a defensive end and long snapper. He finished his college career with five sacks, and 189 tackles (15 tackles for loss). He graduated with Bachelor's and Master’s degrees in Speech Pathology.

Professional career

Indianapolis Colts
Snow went unselected in the 2000 NFL Draft, however he signed with the Indianapolis Colts as a free agent and began serving as the team's long snapper and a back-up tight end. In 2003, Snow and kicker Mike Vanderjagt, along with the holder (Hunter Smith) became the first snapper, holder and kicker trio in the league's history to go an entire season, including the playoffs, without missing a field goal or point-after attempt. Snow played with former Cooper High School teammate Dominic Rhodes on the Colts.  Super Bowl XLI, a game in which three players that once resided in Abilene, Texas participated. Snow and Rhodes both played for the Colts and for Cooper High School, and Danieal Manning played for the Chicago Bears and attended Abilene Christian University. Prior to Super Bowl XLI, only one other person that once lived in Abilene, Texas had played in the Super Bowl, Terry Orr. Orr played for Cooper High School in Abilene as well as the Washington Redskins where he played in Super Bowls XXII and XXVI. On August 31, 2012, Snow was cut from the Colts ending his twelve-year career as a Colt.

Washington Redskins
Snow signed with the Washington Redskins on September 11, 2012. On November 6, Snow was waived by the Redskins after they activated Nick Sundberg from injured reserve.

References

External links
 ESPN Profile
 Indianapolis Colts bio
 Washington Redskins bio

1976 births
American football long snappers
Baylor Bears football players
Indianapolis Colts players
Players of American football from Texas
Washington Redskins players
Living people
Sportspeople from Abilene, Texas